Rolf Gölz (born 30 September 1962) is a retired road and track cyclist from Germany, who was a professional rider from 1985 to 1993. He won the German National Road Race in 1985 and narrowly missed the podium in the 1987 UCI World Championship finishing in 4th place.

He represented West Germany at the 1984 Summer Olympics in Los Angeles, California, where he won the silver medal in the men's individual pursuit, behind America's Steve Hegg. At the same Olympic Games, Gölz also claimed the bronze medal in the 4,000 m team pursuit. Other victories included the 1988 editions of Paris–Brussels and the Nissan Classic.

Major results

1983
Nacht von Hannover
1983
 World Amateur Track Team Pursuit Championship
1985
 National Road Race Championship
Vuelta a Andalucía
Firenze–Pistoia
1986
Aachen
Fellbach
Stuttgart
Giro di Campania
1987
Hamburg
Hengelo
Munster
Reutlingen
Vuelta a Andalucía
Tour du Haut-Var
Züri-Metzgete
Tour de France:
Winner stage 15
1988
Goppingen
Tour of Ireland
Walsrode
Vuelta a Asturias
La Flèche Wallonne
Tour de France:
Winner stage 8
Paris–Brussels
Milano–Torino
Giro del Piemonte
1989
Milano–Torino
1990
Trofeo Baracchi (with Tom Cordes)
1992
Hegiberg-Rundfahrt
Tour Méditerranéen

References

External links 

Official Tour de France results for Rolf Gölz

1962 births
Living people
People from Biberach (district)
Sportspeople from Tübingen (region)
German track cyclists
German male cyclists
Cyclists at the 1984 Summer Olympics
Olympic cyclists of West Germany
Olympic silver medalists for West Germany
Olympic bronze medalists for West Germany
German Tour de France stage winners
Olympic medalists in cycling
Cyclists from Baden-Württemberg
German cycling road race champions
Medalists at the 1984 Summer Olympics
20th-century German people